The human AGXT2 gene encodes the protein Alanine—glyoxylate aminotransferase 2.

Function 

The protein encoded by this gene is a class III pyridoxal-phosphate-dependent mitochondrial aminotransferase. It catalyzes the conversion of glyoxylate to glycine using L-alanine as the amino donor.

References

Further reading 

 
 
 
 
 
 
 

Genes on human chromosome 5